The Saintly Sinner is a 1917 American silent crime drama film directed by Raymond Wells and starring Ruth Stonehouse, Jack Mulhall and Alida Hayman.

Cast
 Ruth Stonehouse as Jane Lee
 Jack Mulhall as George Barnes
 Alida Hayman as Bess Murphy
 Dorothy Drake as Mrs. Carrington
 Henry Devries as John Brock
 Raymond Whitaker as Richard White 
 Fred Montague as Governor Barnes 
 T.D. Crittenden as Jane's Father

References

Bibliography
 Robert B. Connelly. The Silents: Silent Feature Films, 1910-36, Volume 40, Issue 2. December Press, 1998.

External links
 

1917 films
1917 drama films
1910s English-language films
American silent feature films
Silent American drama films
American black-and-white films
Universal Pictures films
Films directed by Raymond Wells
1910s American films
English-language drama films